The Antelope Valley of the California High Desert AVA is an American Viticultural Area north of Los Angeles. The AVA is near the Sierra Pelona Valley AVA and the Leona Valley AVA.

Geography and climate

The Antelope Valley region is an east-facing valley, opening up to the Mojave Desert, with the Tehachapi Mountains to the north and west, and the San Gabriel Mountains, the Sierra Pelona Mountains, and Portal Ridge to the south. Summers are generally hot and dry, with cool, snow-less winters.

References

American Viticultural Areas
American Viticultural Areas of Southern California
Antelope Valley
Geography of Los Angeles County, California
American Viticultural Areas of California
2010 establishments in California